AS Juventus de Saint-Martin is a Saint Martin football club based in Sandy Ground. Club colors are black and white.

In the 2003–04 season, the club won the Saint-Martin Championships, the top tier of football in the Collectivity of Saint Martin

The club withdrew from the 2014/15 competition.

Honours 
 Saint-Martin Championships
 Champions (1): 2003–04

References

External links
  Official website
 Club profile at Footballzz.com
 Club profile  at Weltfussballarchiv.com
 Saint-Martin Football Association

Juventus, Saint Martin